Ethan Read Bamber (born 17 December 1998) is an English cricketer. Bamber signed a professional contract with Middlesex in 2018. He made his first-class debut for Middlesex in the 2018 County Championship on 17 August 2018. Prior to his first-class debut, he was named in England's squad for the 2018 Under-19 Cricket World Cup.

Career
Bamber was England's joint top wicket taker at the 2018 U19 Cricket World Cup in New Zealand. He finished the tournament as England's joint leading wicket taker. Bamber also toured South Africa with the England Young Lions.

He made his Twenty20 debut for Middlesex, against Leinster Lightning on 21 June 2019, during Middlesex's tour of Ireland. On 14 July 2019, Bamber joined Gloucestershire on a one-month loan, making his debut the next day in the County Championship against Leicestershire. He made his List A debut on 25 July 2021, for Middlesex in the 2021 Royal London One-Day Cup.

Bamber received his county cap in May 2022.

Personal life
The son of actor David Bamber, Ethan Bamber studied theology at Exeter University. He was a chorister with the Choir of St John's College, Cambridge before attending Mill Hill School, a private school in North London. He supports Arsenal FC and has regularly watched Saracens FC.

References

External links
 

1998 births
Living people
English cricketers
Gloucestershire cricketers
Middlesex cricketers
People from Westminster
Berkshire cricketers